was a Japanese football player and manager. He played for Japan national team.

Club career
Miyamoto was born in Hiroshima on December 26, 1940. After graduating from high school, he joined Yawata Steel (later Nippon Steel) in 1959. The club won 1964 Emperor's Cup. In 1965, Yawata Steel joined new league Japan Soccer League. In 1967, he was selected Japanese Footballer of the Year awards. He retired in 1976. He played 138 games and scored 68 goals in the league. He was selected Best Eleven for 6 years in a row (1966-1971).

National team career
In June 1961, Miyamoto was selected Japan national team for 1962 World Cup qualification. At this qualification, on June 11, he debuted against South Korea. He was selected Japan for 1964 Summer Olympics in Tokyo and 1968 Summer Olympics in Mexico City. He played all matches at both Olympics and Japan won the bronze medal 1968 Olympics. In 2018, this team was selected Japan Football Hall of Fame. He also played at 1962, 1966 and 1970 Asian Games. At 1972 Summer Olympics qualification in 1971, Japan's failure to qualify for 1972 Summer Olympics. This qualification was his last game for Japan. He played 58 games and scored 19 goals for Japan until 1971.

Coaching career
In 1976, when Miyamoto played for Nippon Steel, he became a playing manager. He managed until 1979.

On February 2, 2000, Miyamoto died of heart failure in Kitakyushu at the age of 59. In 2006, he was selected Japan Football Hall of Fame.

National team statistics

Awards
 Japanese Footballer of the Year: 1967
 Japan Soccer League Best Eleven: (6) 1966, 1967, 1968, 1969, 1970, 1971
 Japan Soccer League Silver Ball (Assist Leader): 1970

References

External links

 
 Japan National Football Team Database
Japan Football Hall of Fame at Japan Football Association
Japan Football Hall of Fame (Japan team at 1968 Olympics) at Japan Football Association

1940 births
2000 deaths
Association football people from Hiroshima Prefecture
Japanese footballers
Japan international footballers
Japan Soccer League players
Nippon Steel Yawata SC players
Japanese football managers
Olympic footballers of Japan
Footballers at the 1964 Summer Olympics
Footballers at the 1968 Summer Olympics
Olympic bronze medalists for Japan
Olympic medalists in football
Asian Games medalists in football
Asian Games bronze medalists for Japan
Footballers at the 1962 Asian Games
Footballers at the 1966 Asian Games
Footballers at the 1970 Asian Games
Medalists at the 1968 Summer Olympics
Hibakusha
Association football midfielders
Medalists at the 1966 Asian Games